Sander Debroux (born 23 September 1982 in Etterbeek) is a Belgian retired footballer.

Between 2004 and 2009, Debroux played five seasons for Sint-Truiden, the first four of which in the Belgian First Division. He played 94 matches at the highest level, scoring 4 goals. Thereafter, he moved back to OH Leuven at the beginning of the 2009-10 season and to Tempo Overijse during the 2010-11 season.

References

1982 births
Living people
Belgian footballers
R.W.D. Molenbeek players
Oud-Heverlee Leuven players
Sint-Truidense V.V. players
Belgian Pro League players
Challenger Pro League players

Association football midfielders